Malleostemon uniflorus is a plant species of the family Myrtaceae endemic to Western Australia.

It is found in an area in the Gascoyne extending into the Mid West region of Western Australia.

References

uniflorus
Flora of Western Australia
Plants described in 2016
Taxa named by Barbara Lynette Rye